Polylepis crista-galli is a species of plant in the family Rosaceae. It is endemic to Bolivia.  It is threatened by habitat loss.

References

crista-galli
Endemic flora of Bolivia
Flora of the Andes
Páramo flora
Vulnerable plants
Taxonomy articles created by Polbot
Taxa named by Friedrich August Georg Bitter

es:Polylepis crista-galli